"The Gold Rush Is Over" is a song written by Cindy Walker, sung by Hank Snow, and released on the RCA Victor label (catalog no. 20-4522). In April 1952, it peaked at No. 2 on Billboards country and western juke box chart (No. 4 best seller and jockey). It spent 18 weeks on the charts and was ranked No. 10 on Billboards 1952 year-end country and western juke box chart and No. 13 on the year-end best seller chart.

See also
 Billboard Top Country & Western Records of 1952

References

Hank Snow songs
1952 songs
Songs written by Cindy Walker